The Marlin Model 795 is an American .22 LR semi-automatic rifle produced by Remington Arms of Mayfield, Kentucky, formerly by Marlin Firearms Company of North Haven, Connecticut. Major features include micro-groove barrel, a cross-bolt safety, black synthetic stock, and 10-round nickel plated box magazine. It is similar to the Marlin 60, with slight barrel and action differences due to the magazine differences.

Manufacturer Recommended Ammunition 
CCI Mini-Mag
CCI Mini-Mag Hollow Point
Federal Classic High Velocity
Winchester Super X High Velocity

Variants 
 Model 795-blued steel barrel and receiver
 Model 795SS-stainless steel barrel and receiver
 Model 795LTR (LTR stood for Liberty Training Rifle), produced in 2013 in collaboration with Project Appleseed.
Model 70PSS takedown version, produced from 1984–present.  (SS is the stainless steel version)
 Marlin 70HC with 25-round magazine (HC stood for High Capacity), produced from 1988–1996.
 Glenfield 70 with 7 & 12-round magazines from 1988–1996.
 Marlin 7000 - Heavy Target Barrel version of the 795, made from 1997-2004

References

Marlin Firearms Company firearms
Rifles of the United States
.22 LR semi-automatic rifles